Dile may refer to:

 Dile (automobile), an American automobile manufactured in Reading, Pennsylvania
 "Dile" (Don Omar song), 2004
 "Dile" (Ivy Queen song), 2004
 "Dile" (Lynda song), 1997
 "Dile", a 2019 song by Akon from El Negreeto
 Drug-induced lupus erythematosus